Elephant sanctuary may refer to:

 A wildlife refuge for elephants
Elephant Jungle Sanctuary, Chiang Mai, Thailand
Elephant Nature Park, Chiang Mai, Thailand
Mwaluganje Elephant Sanctuary, Kenya
The Elephant Sanctuary (Hohenwald), Tennessee
 The Elephant Sanctuary Plettenberg Bay, South Africa
 The Elephant Sanctuary Hartbeespoort Dam, South Africa
 The Elephant Sanctuary Hazyview, South Africa
 The Kuala Gandah Elephant Sanctuary, Pahang, Malaysia
 Riddle's Elephant and Wildlife Sanctuary, Greenbrier, Arkansas